Cape Pembroke is an uninhabited headland at the northeastern tip of Coats Island in northern Hudson Bay within the Kivalliq Region of Nunavut, Canada.

Geography

Conservation
The cape is a Canadian Important Bird Area (#NU005) and a Key Migratory Bird Habitat Site.

Fauna
Notable bird species include thick-billed murre, black guillemots, peregrine falcon, glaucous gull, and common eider.

Walrus frequent the area.

History
It was discovered in 1612 and named by Sir Thomas Button, a Welsh officer of the Royal Navy.

References

Landforms of Hudson Bay
Pembroke
Important Bird Areas of Kivalliq Region